Silvat is an Indian short film under the Zeal For Unity festival 2016. It is written by Faraz Arif Ansari and directed by Tanuja Chandra, and has Kartik Aaryan and Meher Mistry as lead roles. Categorised under the genre of romance and drama, it has a total run time of 42 minutes. Kartik Aaryan shot this short film while filming Pyar Ka Panchnama 2.

Plot

Noor has been living by herself for the last five years after her husband takes up a job abroad in the first week of their marriage. She seldom hears from him; sometimes through a letter, a rare phone call or through the money he sends her every 3 months or so. Her married life is nothing more than a never-ending wait for her husband to return to her someday. Until one fateful day she realizes that she has fallen in love with a much younger man, a tailor named Anwar. Her feelings are reciprocated but Anwar fails to see the unspoken love she harbours for him, and thinks his love will remain unrequited. Thus he does his best not to exhibit his feelings in front of her. Can she keep up with the role of playing a devout wife to her husband or will she give in to the lover she yearns for with every passing moment?

Cast

 Kartik Aaryan as Anwar Khan
 Meher Mistry as Noor

References

External links
 
 https://indianexpress.com/article/entertainment/web-series/silvat-review-kartik-aaryan-tanuja-chandra-5348718/

Indian short films
Films directed by Tanuja Chandra